Talbot Talmage Hunter (October 9, 1884 – November 9, 1928) was a Canadian college hockey, lacrosse, and soccer coach. He served as a coach at Cornell University, Yale University, the United States Military Academy at West Point, and Harvard University.

Biography
Hunter was a native of Toronto, Ontario, and attended the University of Toronto. He coached the Cornell University ice hockey from the 1909–10 season through the 1911–12 season. He led the Big Red to the 1912 intercollegiate hockey championship.

In 1914, Hunter returned to Cornell to take over the soccer team, and later, the hockey team. In 1915, his responsibilities were increased to include those of head coach for the lacrosse team, of which he was the first non-student-coach. Hunter coached the lacrosse team for two seasons and amassed a 7–8–1 record. Hunter was the first person to coach all three sports at Cornell. His Cornell soccer teams compiled a 2–5–5 record over his two seasons, and his hockey teams amassed a 20–15–0 record.

In 1919, he was hired as head coach of the Yale University hockey, lacrosse, and soccer teams.

Hunter coached the Army lacrosse team from 1921 to 1923, and compiled a 16–5–1 record. In 1923, he led Army to an 8–1–1 record and its first national championship in lacrosse. He coached the hockey team from 1921 to 1923 and compiled a 12–12–2 record.

Hunter served as the head coach for the Harvard University lacrosse team in 1927 and amassed a 3–8 record. He began 1928 as coach, but fell ill midway through the season and was replaced by H. W. Jeffers.

College Head coaching record

Ice Hockey

References

1884 births
1928 deaths
Army Black Knights men's ice hockey coaches
Army Black Knights men's lacrosse coaches
Canadian soccer coaches
Cornell Big Red men's soccer coaches
Cornell Big Red men's lacrosse coaches
Harvard Crimson men's lacrosse coaches
Yale Bulldogs men's ice hockey coaches
Yale Bulldogs men's lacrosse coaches
Yale Bulldogs men's soccer coaches
University of Toronto alumni
People from Old Toronto
Lacrosse people from Ontario
Soccer people from Ontario
Cornell Big Red men's ice hockey coaches
Ice hockey people from Ontario